Westfield World Trade Center, also known as the Oculus, is a shopping mall at the World Trade Center complex in Manhattan, New York, that is operated and managed by Unibail-Rodamco-Westfield. The mall opened on August 16, 2016, as the largest shopping complex in Manhattan, with 125 retail spaces. It replaced the Mall at the World Trade Center, the underground shopping mall under the original World Trade Center, which was destroyed on September 11, 2001.

Original mall (1975–2001)

The Mall at the World Trade Center was an indoor underground shopping mall that was located in the concourse area of the original World Trade Center complex which was destroyed on September 11, 2001.

Most of the mall was located underneath 4 and 5 World Trade Center, as well as under the Austin J. Tobin Plaza. Completed in 1975, it was the largest shopping mall in New York City, and was managed by the Westfield Group. The main entrance was located on the south side of 4 World Trade Center facing Liberty Street with escalators going down into the concourse. The other entrance was located on the east side of 5 World Trade Center facing Church Street. PATH trains intersected in the basement levels, which were located under the mall.

The mall included eateries as well as approximately 80 stores, including Borders, Banana Republic, Coach, The Children's Place, Tourneau, J. Crew, Cole Haan, Sephora, Duane Reade, Gap, Sam Goody, Victoria's Secret, The Disney Store and the Warner Bros. Studio Store. Thousands of people traveled through the mall daily.

On April 26, 2001 the Port Authority of New York & New Jersey agreed to lease the mall to the Westfield Group on a 99 year agreement. On July 24, 2001 the deal was accepted. After the purchase, Westfield was planning a massive renovation and expansion of the mall, and was going to rename it Westfield Shoppingtown World Trade Center in 2002.

September 11 attacks
A commonly reported story of eyewitnesses inside the mall at 8:46 a.m. EDT, when American Airlines Flight 11 struck the North Tower, is of fireballs fed by flaming jet fuel shooting down the elevator shafts and bursting out of the elevators inside the lobby, with many of the fireballs reaching as far as the mall itself.

As stated in the 9/11 Commission Report:

The Port Authority's on-site commanding police officer was standing in the concourse when a fireball exploded out of the North Tower lobby, causing him to dive for cover.

Survivor Allison Summers described the conditions in the mall right after the terrorist attack:

I had almost reached the [Cortlandt Street] Uptown 1 and 9 station when there was an enormous explosion. The building shook. I heard people say, 'Oh, no.' Some, not many, were screaming. ... I looked ahead past Banana Republic, past Citibank to the plaza outside. At that moment, there was a terrifying tidal wave of smoke filling the doorway. It began to shoot forward. The smoke had this enormous momentum that started to come towards us, as if it had a will of its own.  We ran. We ran together past the Coach store. We ran to get out of the path of this enormous wave of smoke. It was like we were being chased. All the people on the concourse ran. We turned right, heading toward the PATH trains.  As we ran, shop assistants were calling in doorways, 'What happened? What happened?' But we were running so fast we couldn't answer them and they ran with us. Some people were crying; some people were screaming. We moved as one body. No one pushed and no one shoved. We all had the same intention: to get out of the building.

Shortly after the first impact, water began spraying into the mall from broken pipes or activated sprinkler systems. As Erik Ronningen describes:

I drag my body down through the decimated main lobby [of the North Tower], through a waterfall from the Mall ceiling, and wade the darkened Mall corridor through 75 yards [69 m] of ankle-deep water to Tower Two." 

The mall itself played an important role during the attacks because the people who were evacuating the Twin Towers could not exit outside onto the plaza because of falling debris, so they traveled through the mall, and exited through either 4 or 5 World Trade Center. 

The mall was heavily damaged by the collapse of the two towers and was ultimately demolished following the September 11 attacks.

Current mall (2016–present) 

Although the new mall is only spread over roughly one-half of the original mall's footprint (due to the new space required for the below-grade National September 11 Memorial & Museum), the mall is double-level, whereas the original mall was a single level. Three additional levels will exist above-grade on the lower floors of 2 and 3 World Trade Center, while 4 World Trade Center currently houses four above-grade levels. The World Trade Center station's head house, the Oculus, also houses a large amount of retail space.

According to developer Larry Silverstein, whose firm Silverstein Properties was replaced by Westfield Corporation as the developer:

Construction on the One World Trade Center portion of the mall began in 2007. In February 2012, Westfield Corporation entered an agreement with the Port Authority, which owns the rest of the World Trade Center site, to jointly own and manage the mall. At the same time, Westfield began marketing space in the mall and opened a leasing office in 7 World Trade Center. In December 2013, the Port Authority sold its remaining stake in the retail development to Westfield. This also brings retail at the World Trade Center to Westfield's complete control. The mall was 80% leased . The mall's 125 retail spaces were fully leased by October 2015.

The mall opened on August 16, 2016, with a concert headlined by John Legend and Leslie Odom Jr., the opening of a food court and stores such as Pandora and Apple. In total, there were 60 stores in the mall when it opened. By 2017, there were 82 stores within the mall, although much of the mall's space had not been leased. Some tenants were also moving out, and the Port Authority was also rebuilding nine storefronts in front of the PATH station's entrance. These nine storefronts, which were considered prime retail space, were not available because that location had been the site of the former entrance to the temporary PATH station.

References

External links

 
 ICSC article describing buy-out
 The Mall on Labelscar
  Original floor directory/map graphics downloaded from the Port Authority of NY/NJ
 The New WTC Media Center - The Port Authority of New York & New Jersey

Buildings and structures destroyed in the September 11 attacks
Westfield
Port Authority of New York and New Jersey
Shopping malls in New York City
Westfield Group
World Trade Center
2016 establishments in New York City
Shopping malls established in 2016